Bone marrow failure occurs in individuals who produce an insufficient amount of red blood cells, white blood cells or platelets. Red blood cells transport oxygen to be distributed throughout the body's tissue. White blood cells fight off infections that enter the body. Bone marrow also contains platelets, which trigger clotting, and thus help stop the blood flow when a wound occurs.

Signs and symptoms 
The two most common signs and symptoms of bone marrow failure are bleeding and bruising. Blood may be seen throughout the gums, nose or the skin, and tend to last longer than normal. Children have a bigger chance of seeing blood in their urine or stools, which results in digestive problems with an unpleasant scent. Individuals with this condition may also encounter tooth loss or tooth decay. Chronic fatigue, shortness of breath, and recurrent colds can also be symptoms of bone marrow failure.

Causes 
Bone marrow failure in both children and adults can be either inherited or acquired. Inherited bone marrow failure is often the cause in young children, while older children and adults may acquire the disease later in life.  A maturation defect in genes is a common cause of inherited bone marrow failure. The most common cause of acquired bone marrow failure is aplastic anemia. Working with chemicals such as benzene could be a factor in causing the illness. Other factors include radiation or chemotherapy treatments, and immune system problems.

Diagnosis

Treatment 
The type of treatment depends on the severity of the patient's bone marrow failure disease.  Blood transfusion is one treatment. Blood is collected from volunteer donors who agree to let doctors draw blood stem cells from their blood or bone marrow for transplantation.   Blood that is taken straight from collected blood stem cells is known as peripheral blood stem cell donation. A peripheral stem cell donor must have the same blood type as the patient receiving the blood cells. Once the stem cells are in the patient's body through an IV, the cells mature and become blood cells. Before donation, a drug is injected into the donor, which increases the number of stem cells into their body. Feeling cold and lightheaded, having numbness around the mouth and cramping in the hands are common symptoms during the donation process. After the donation, the amount of time for recovery varies for every donor, "But most stem cell donors are able to return to their usual activities within a few days to a week after donation".

Epidemiology 
For those with severe bone marrow failure, the cumulative incidence of resulting stem cell transplantation or death was greater than 70% by individuals 60 years of age. The incidence of bone marrow failure is triphasic: one peak at two to five years during childhood (due to inherited causes), and two peaks in adulthood, between 20 and 25 years old and after 60 years old (from acquired causes).

One in ten individuals with bone marrow failure have unsuspected Fanconi anemia (FA). FA is the most common inherited bone marrow failure with an incidence of one to five episodes per million individuals. The carrier frequency for FA is 1 in 200 to 300, however this differs by ethnicity. In Europe and North America, the incidence of acquired aplastic anemia is rare with two episodes per million people each year, yet in Asia rises with 3.9 to 7.4 episodes per million people each year. While acquired aplastic anemia with an unknown cause is rare, it is commonly permanent and life-threatening as half of those with this condition die within the first six months.

The prevalence of bone marrow failure is over three times higher in Japan and East Asia than in the United States and Europe. When one's body fails to produce blood cell lines, the morbidity and mortality rate increases. Myelodysplastic syndromes (MDS) is a form of blood cancer found within the bone marrow in which the body no longer produces enough healthy, normal blood cells. MDS are a frequently unrecognized and rare group of bone marrow failure disorders, yet the incidence rate has rose from 143 reported cases in 1973 to approximately 15,000 cases in the United States each year. Although MDS is often under-diagnosed, leading the believed actual incidence rate to be estimated at 35,000 to 55,000 new cases annually. One in three people with MDS progress to acute myeloid leukemia. For lower risk patients, those who do not undergo a bone marrow transplant have an average survival rate of up to six years. However, high-risk patients have a survival rate of approximately five months.

History 
Bone marrow failure is associated with three types of diseases, Fanconi anemia (FA), dyskeratosis congenita, and aplastic anemia. Fanconi anemia is an inherited blood disorder due to abnormal breakages in DNA genes. It is linked to hyperpigmentation, which is the darkening of an area of skin or nails caused by increased melanin. According to Histopathology, "However, in about 30% of FA patients no physical abnormalities are found". Dyskeratosis congenita often affects multiple parts of the body. Individuals with this disorder usually show changes in skin pigmentations, unusual fingernail growth, and mucosa leukoplakia; the inner part of the mouth is encased with white patches that may never resolve. Aplastic anemia happens when bone marrow doesn't produce enough new blood cells throughout the body. Aplastic anemia is an acquired autoimmune disease, which occurs when the immune system mistakenly attacks and destroys healthy body tissue.

References

Hematology

es:Anemia aplásica
fr:Insuffisance médullaire